The Oakland Post may refer to:

 The Oakland Post (California), San Francisco East Bay news weekly
 The Oakland Post (Michigan), Oakland University news weekly